Talei Holmes (born 23 March 2000) is an Australian rugby league footballer who plays for the St George Illawarra Dragons in the NRL Women's Premiership and the Cronulla-Sutherland Sharks in the NSWRL Women's Premiership. 

Primarily a er, she is a Fiji representative.

Background
Holmes was born in Sutherland, New South Wales and played her junior rugby league for Cronulla-Caringbah. She is of Fijian descent.

Playing career
In 2017 and 2018, Holmes played for the Cronulla-Sutherland Sharks in the Tarsha Gale Cup, winning a premiership with the team in 2018.

In 2019, Holmes moved up to the Sharks' NSWRL Women's Premiership team.

2020
On 24 September, Holmes joined the St George Illawarra Dragons NRL Women's Premiership team. In Round 1 of the 2020 NRL Women's season, she made her debut for the Dragons in a 4–18 loss to the Sydney Roosters.

References

External links
St George Illawarra Dragons profile
Fiji Bulikula profile

2000 births
Living people
Australian people of Fijian descent
Australian female rugby league players
Fiji women's national rugby league team players
Rugby league second-rows
St. George Illawarra Dragons (NRLW) players